A Default Credential vulnerability is a type of vulnerability in a computing device that most commonly affects devices having some pre-set (default) administrative credentials to access all configuration settings. The vendor or manufacturer of such devices uses a single pre-defined set of admin credentials to access the device configurations, and any potential hacker can misuse this fact to hack such devices, if those credentials are not changed by consumers.

Examples
There are several Proof-of-Concept (POC), as well as real world worms running across internet, which are configured to search for systems set with a default username and password. Voyager Alpha Force, Zotob, and MySpooler are a few examples of POC malware which scan the Internet for specific devices, and try to login using the default credentials.

In the real world, many forms of malware, such as Mirai, have used this vulnerability. Once devices have been compromised by exploiting the Default Credential vulnerability, they can themselves be used for various harmful purposes, such as carrying out Distributed Denial of Service (DDoS) attacks. In one particular incident, a hacker was able to gain access and control of a large number of networks including those of University of Maryland, Baltimore County, Imagination, Capital Market Strategies L, by leveraging the fact that they were using the default credentials for their NetGear switch.

References

See also

 Attack (computing)
 Threat (computer)

Web security exploits